Rome's Crossing Halt (Manx: Stadd Crossag Rome) is an intermediate stop on the northerly section of the Manx Electric Railway on the Isle of Man. It serves the holiday let Croit Rance and is located in the parish of Maughold.

Route

Also
Manx Electric Railway Stations

References

Sources
 Manx Manx Electric Railway Stopping Places (2002) Manx Electric Railway Society
 Island Island Images: Manx Electric Railway Pages (2003) Jon Wornham
 Official Official Tourist Department Page (2009) Isle Of Man Heritage Railways

Railway stations in the Isle of Man
Manx Electric Railway